Sasang Station is a station on the Busan Metro Line 2 and BGLRT Line located in Gwaebeop-dong, Sasang District, Busan. The subname in parentheses of Busan Metro is Seobu Bus Terminal.

The planned Busan Metro Line 5 (Sasang-Hadan Line) will connect to this station.

Gallery

External links

  Cyber station information from Busan Transportation Corporation
 Cyber station information, BGLRT Line from Busan Transportation Corporation 

Busan Metro stations
Sasang District
Railway stations in South Korea opened in 1999